The Romblon Provincial Board is the Sangguniang Panlalawigan (provincial legislature) of the Philippine province of Romblon.

The members are elected via plurality-at-large voting: the province is divided into two districts, one sending one member and the other sending seven members to the provincial board; the electorate votes the number of seats allocated for their district, with the candidates with the highest number of votes (first in the first district and the first seven in the second) being elected. The vice governor is the ex officio presiding officer, and only votes to break ties. The vice governor is elected via the plurality voting system throughout the province.

District apportionment

1st District: Banton, Concepcion, Corcuera, San Fernando, Magdiwang, Cajidiocan, Romblon and San Agustin.
2nd District: Alcantara, Ferrol, Looc, Odiongan, San Andres, San Jose, Calatrava, Santa Fe, and Santa Maria.

List of members

Vice Governor

1st and 2nd District

References

Provincial boards in the Philippines
Politics of Romblon